Rezső Dillinger was a Hungarian figure skater who competed in pair skating.

With partner Lucy Galló, in 1935 he won bronze medals at both the World Figure Skating Championships and the European Figure Skating Championships.

Competitive highlights 
With Lucy Galló

References 

Hungarian male pair skaters
Date of birth missing
Date of death missing